Chenchrirampur Union is one of the six union councils under Kathalia Upazila of Jhalakati District in the Barishal Division of southern region of Bangladesh.

Geography  
Chenchrirampur Union is situated at the Kathalia Sadar of Kathalia Upazila.

Chenchrirampur has an area of 8441 acres.

Administration 
Chenchrirampur Union is under Kathalia Upazila.The administrative activities of this union is under Kathalia Union Parishad. This is included in the Jhalakathi-1 constituency of the National Parliament .

At present, there are 8 villages under Chenchrirampur Union. The administrative activities of this union is under Chenchrirampur Union Parishad.

Demographics 
According to Census-2011, The total population of Chenchrirampur Union is 25,044.Among them number of male is 12,193 and number of female is 12,851.Number of total family is 6.067.

Educational 
According to the Census-2011, the literacy rate of Kathalia Union is about 69%.

Number of educational institutions 

 College-01
 Primary School-16
 Junior School-01
 Community School-01
 Dakhil Madrasa-05
 Reg. Primary School-01
 High School-05
 Primary Madrasa-02
 Technical College-01

Places of interest

Doctor Bari Majar 
Every year there held Annual Orosh and Mahfil.

See also 
 Upazilas of Bangladesh
 Districts of Bangladesh
 Divisions of Bangladesh

References

External links 

Unions of Kathalia Upazila
Jhalokati District